Nagat Ali (born 1975) is an Egyptian poet. She was born and raised in Cairo. She studied Arabic literature at university, and is working on a PhD dissertation on Naguib Mahfouz. The author of three books of poetry, she was named as one of the Beirut39 list of young Arab writers.

References

Egyptian poets
Egyptian women poets
1975 births
Living people
Female writers from Cairo
Date of birth missing (living people)
21st-century Egyptian women writers